Rock Star or Rockstar may refer to:

Films 
 Rock Star (2001 film), an American film starring Mark Wahlberg
 Rockstar (2011 film), an Indian Hindi-language film by Imtiaz Ali
 Rockstar (2015 film), an Indian Malayalam-language film by V. K. Prakash

Television 
 Rock Star (TV series), a reality television program about the selection of a new lead vocalist for a different band each season
 Rock Star: INXS, the first season of the above reality television program
 Rock Star: Supernova, the second season of the above reality television program
 Rock Star Supernova, a band created by this series

Music

Albums 
 Rockstar (Bosson album)
 Rockstar (Sfera Ebbasta album)
 Rockstar (soundtrack), Bollywood film soundtrack by A.R. Rahman
 Rokstarr, an album by Taio Cruz

Songs
 "Rockstar" (Bizarre song), 2005
 "Rockstar" (DaBaby song), 2020
 "Rockstar" (Dappy song), 2012
 "Rockstar" (Nickelback song), 2005
 "Rockstar" (Poison song), 2001
 "Rockstar" (Post Malone song), 2017
 "Rockstar" (Prima J song), 2007
 "Rock Star" (Hannah Montana song), 2007
 "Rock Star" (N.E.R.D song), 2001
 "Rock Star" (R. Kelly song), 2007
 "Rock Star" (Reece Mastin song), 2012
 "Rockstar 101", by Rihanna, 2009
 "Rockstar", by Ali Zafar from the TV show Coke Studio, 2015 (season 8)
 "Rockstar", by Brokencyde from I'm Not a Fan, But the Kids Like It!, 2009
 "Rock Star", by Hole from Live Through This, 1994 (initially titled "Olympia" but mislabeled)
 "Rockstar", by Emily Kinney, 2014
 "Rockstar", by Jimmy Eat World from Static Prevails, 1996
 "Rockstar", by Mallrat, 2020
 "Rock Star", by Willow Smith, 2011

Other 
 Rockstar Consortium, an organization formed to negotiate licensing for patents acquired from bankrupt Nortel
 Rockstar Games, a games developer most notable for the Grand Theft Auto series, and its subsidiaries
 Rockstar (drink), a brand of energy drink
 Rockstar (esoteric programming language)

See also 
 Popstar (disambiguation)
 "(Si Si) Je Suis un Rock Star", a 1981 song by Bill Wyman
 Superstar (disambiguation)
 Star rock